Dreamhunter (2005) and Dreamquake (2007) are two fantasy novels, written by New Zealand author Elizabeth Knox. The former title was nominated for Montana New Zealand Book Awards in 2006, and was an American Library Association best book of 2007. Dreamquake received recognition as an Honor Book for the Michael L. Printz Award in 2008. The U.K. title of Dreamhunter is The Rainbow Opera.

Synopsis
Southland is an alternate universe Edwardian version of a New Zealand, one without any indigenous inhabitants. Instead, Southland boasts an other-dimensional realm entitled "the Place," in which those able to do so can 'capture' dreams that are bound to particular areas of Place geography, which exist within specific bands. As a result of the discovery of guided dreaming, a dreamhunter industry has been created. Professional dreamhunters occupy a social niche comparable to artists and authors in our own world, and one of the most imposing structures in Founderston, Southland's capital, is the "Rainbow Opera," in which virtuoso dreamhunters perform before the nation's elite.

Grace Tiebold and Tziga Hame are sister and brother in law by marriage, and are particularly potent dreamhunters. While Grace's daughter Rose lacks the talent, Tziga's daughter Laura possesses it. Each year, scores of teenagers attempt to become dreamhunters in a rite of passage, but few achieve interdimensional transit to the Place. Tziga and Laura Hame are able to create golems using an ancestral power called "The Measures." In the second novel, it transpires that these golems have an unheralded but ingenious relationship to the Place's very existence.

Southland was settled by the British, later than America but earlier than Australia. People from Elprus, an Aegean island obliterated by volcanic activity, arrived in the eighteenth century. Southland's official church is a "Southern Orthodox Church" which regards the practice of dreamhunting as immoral and unethical. Southland's republican government begs to differ, as its unscrupulous Minister of the Interior, Cas Doran, was the architect of the Intangible Resources Act 1896, and is planning a coup d'etat which will exploit dreamhunter capabilities to provide manipulated consent to his anticipated authoritarian rule.

Characters

Laura Hame
Laura Hame is the protagonist and heroine of the duet. She is about sixteen years old and is the daughter of the famous dreamhunter Tziga Hame, who was the first ever. Her mother died when she was very young and she lives with her father, her aunt, Grace Tiebold, her mother's brother, Chorley Tiebold, and her cousin and best friend Rose Tiebold. When they are old enough Laura and Rose Try (the trial of becoming a dreamhunter), and while Laura is successful, it turns out Rose does not have the ability and therefore cannot become a dreamhunter. This puts a slight strain on their relationship, though they remain best friends as ever.
Rose was always the leader in their relationship, and Laura, being more shy and timid, is not used to making decisions by herself. She gains a lot of independence throughout the books by finally learning how to get by without having Rose with her at all times. Laura discovers the terrible deeds that the government executes using dreamhunting (namely the torture of prisoners via nightmares and the use of the dream "Contentment" -which makes one purposeless and zombie-like- to achieve their ends). 
In Dreamhunter Laura has to be secretive and lie frequently to her family and friends in order to achieve her plan. Because of this she becomes lonely and the only person she can truly trust is her "servant" Nown. 
Nown is a creature made of sand who must serve the person who creates him, in this case Laura. Laura grows to rely heavily on Nown (although not in a romantic way).
In Dreamquake Laura instead finds herself being drawn more and more to Sandy Mason, a young man who is in love with her. When catching a dream together in "The Place" Laura realizes her love for him and they sleep together. Later, when at a ball, the building is set on fire. Laura believes Sandy has died in the fire and becomes depressed, hardly ever coming out of bed. She and her family realize she is pregnant with Sandy's child.
Fortunately it turns out he was kidnapped and taken to a camp where they gave him doses of Contentment. Sandy makes his way back and is welcomed into the family, who are overjoyed.
At the end of the series they get married.

Rose Tiebold
Rose Tiebold is Laura Hame's cousin and best friend. She is very outgoing and confident and always believed that she would successfully try to become a dreamhunter. When this is not the case she is shocked and miserable. However her father, Chorley Tiebold, who unlike her mother is not a dreamhunter, tells her that there are many options other than becoming a dreamhunter and he doesn't see why it is such a desirable career anyway. Rose listens to his words and continues to thrive, though she becomes slightly more distant from Laura. Rose soon befriends a girl called Mamie Doran, the daughter of mayor who is a lonely and intelligent girl, though at times slightly spiteful. Rose helps Laura and the rest of her family revolt against the government.

Sandy Mason
Alexander Mason, otherwise known as Sandy Mason, is a young man introduced in the first novel. He is roughly between seventeen and nineteen. Coming from a rather poor family, when he first meets Laura Hame and Rose Tiebold, he doesn't respect them and thinks they are just "silly little children". However, in Dreamquake he falls in love with Laura. In Dreamhunter, he Tries and it turns out he can catch dreams. He and Laura, live in the same motel, called "Miss Lilley's". In Dreamquake he mistakes a letter Laura wrote to her servant, Nown, as a letter to suitor. He draws within himself and becomes moody. When he realizes this isn't the case, he looks after Laura, and they work together. Laura soon finds she loves him too, and while catching a dream called "The Gate", they both kiss each other and become "suitors". When at a ball the building sets on fire, and Sandy is believed dead. As it turns out at the end of the book, he was kidnapped and sent to a camp where he was given doses of the dream Contentment. When the camp is closed thanks to the revolution, Sandy travels back to Laura and her family and is welcomed with open arms. Laura is pregnant with Sandy's child and they get married.

Bibliography
 Elizabeth Knox: Dreamhunter: Sydney: Fourth Estate: 2005: 
 Elizabeth Knox: Dreamquake: Sydney: Fourth Estate: 2007: 
 Elizabeth Knox: Dreamhunter: USA: Frances Foster Books, FSG: 2006: 
 Elizabeth Knox: Dreamquake: USA: Frances Foster Books, FSG: 2007:

References

21st-century New Zealand novels
New Zealand speculative fiction works
Science fiction book series
New Zealand fantasy novels